René Allio (3 August 1924, Marseille – 27 March 1995, Paris) was a French film and theater director.

Filmography 
 The Shameless Old Lady, by Bertolt Brecht (La Vieille Dame indigne, 1965)
 Le cercle de craie caucasien, by Bertolt Brecht (1965)
 La bonne Âme de Setchouan, by Bertolt Brecht (1966)
 Pierre et Paul (1969)
 Moi, Pierre Rivière, ayant égorgé ma mère, ma soeur et mon frère... (1976) 
 Retour à Marseille (1980)
 Le matelot 512 (1984)
  (1991)

References

External links 
 
 

1924 births
1995 deaths
French film directors
Mass media people from Marseille